Fraser Lake is a lake located in the state of Western Australia, about  northeast of  Perth, the state capital.

Fraser Lake is surrounded primarily by forests..  The area around Fraser Lake is almost unpopulated, with less than two inhabitants per square kilometer.  The average annual average is 955 millimeters. The rainiest month is January, with an average of 282 mm rainfall, and the driest is August, with 1 mm rainfall.

References

Lakes of the Kimberley (Western Australia)